Recuerdo a Javier Solís (I remember Javier Solís) is an album that was released in 1994 by Vikki Carr. It won a Grammy Award for Best Mexican-American Recording. The album contains the hit song Amaneci en Tus Brazos. The album is a tribute to Javier Solís, a popular Mexican singer who died in 1966.

Tracks

"Payaso" 
The song "Payaso" is a retelling of the story of the opera Pagliacci by Ruggero Leoncavallo ("payaso" is Spanish for "clown").

Personnel 

Performers
 Lead vocals – Vikki Carr
 Guest vocals – Danny Rivera, Javier Solís

Musicians
 Guitar – Arturo Salas
 Guitarrón – Miguel Vázquez

Production

 Arranger – Chuck Anderson
 Art director – Arturo Medellin
 Composers – Rafael Cardenas, José María Contursí, Mario DeJesús, Luis Demetrio, Noel Estrada, Rubén Fuentes, José Alfredo Jiménez, Fernando Z. Maldonado, Paco Michael, Abelardo Pulido, Raffael Ramirez, José Antonio Zorilla
 Director – Chuck Anderson
 Engineer – Robert Russell
 Graphic design – Rocio Larrazolo
 Liner notes – Chuck Anderson
 Mixing – Robert Russell
 Photography – Harry Langdon
 Producer – Chuck Anderson

External links

References 

 
 

1994 albums
Vikki Carr albums
Tribute albums
Ranchera albums
Spanish-language albums
Grammy Award for Best Mexican/Mexican-American Album